Ranchi Women's College, established in 1949, is one of the oldest women's college in the Jharkhand state of India. It offers undergraduate and postgraduate courses in arts, commerce and sciences. It is affiliated to  Ranchi University.

Location
The college is located in the heart of Ranchi town in the Jharkhand state.

Departments

Science
Chemistry 
Physics 
Mathematics 
Botany 
Zoology 
Biotechnology

Social Science
Home Science
Economics
Geography
Psychology
History
Political Science
Sociology
Commerce

Humanities
Hindi
Bengali
English
Nagpuri
Urdu
Sanskrit
Philosophy
Tribal and Regional Language

See also
Education in India
Ranchi University
List of institutions of higher education in Jharkhand

References

External links
 http://www.ranchiwomenscollege.org/

Colleges affiliated to Ranchi University
Educational institutions established in 1949
Universities and colleges in Ranchi
Universities and colleges in Jharkhand
1949 establishments in India